The Dakh is a river of southwest Russia. It flows through the Republic of Adygea. It is a right tributary of the Belaya. The Sakhray is its left tributary.

References

Rivers of Adygea